Summer Side of Life is Canadian singer-songwriter Gordon Lightfoot's seventh album. It was released in 1971 on the Reprise Records Label. The album marked a departure from the sound Lightfoot had established on Sit Down Young Stranger in its use of drums and electric instrumentation, to which he would later return in the second half of the decade. “Redwood Hill” contains elements of bluegrass music.

The album reached #38 on the pop chart. "Summer Side of Life" peaked at #98 on the pop singles chart while "Talking in Your Sleep" peaked at #64. The singles reached #21 and #19 respectively in Canada.

The track "Cotton Jenny" would later be covered by Anne Murray, for whom it would provide a top-twenty single on the U.S. country singles chart. The song "Love and Maple Syrup" was covered by Taylor Mitchell in 2009. She lost her life in a coyote assault later that year. Nanci Griffith covered "10 Degrees and Getting Colder" on her 1993 album, Other Voices, Other Rooms. The song had previously been recorded by J. D. Crowe & The New South on their eponymous album in 1975.

Track listing
All compositions by Gordon Lightfoot.

Side 1
"10 Degrees and Getting Colder" – 2:43
"Miguel" – 4:12
"Go My Way" – 2:13
"Summer Side of Life" – 4:05
"Cotton Jenny" – 3:26
"Talking in Your Sleep" – 2:56

Side 2
"Nous Vivons Ensemble" – 3:45
"Same Old Loverman" – 3:21
"Redwood Hill" – 2:48
"Love and Maple Syrup" – 3:13
"Cabaret" – 5:49

Chart performance

Personnel
Gordon Lightfoot - guitar, piano, vocals
Red Shea - guitar
Jerry Shook - guitar
Chip Young - guitar
Rick Haynes - bass guitar
Roy M. "Junior" Huskey - acoustic bass
James Rolleston - bass guitar
Henry Strzelecki - bass guitar
Kenneth A. Buttrey - drums
Buddy Harman - drums
Jimmy Isbell - drums
David Brown - percussion
Farrell Morris - percussion
Vassar Clements - violin
Charlie McCoy - harmonica
Hargus "Pig" Robbins - piano
 The Jordanaires (Gordon Stoker, Neal Matthews, Hoyt Hawkins, Ray Walker) - backing vocals
Technical
Rick Horton - engineer, remixing
Harry Kemball - cover photography

References

External links
Album lyrics and chords

Gordon Lightfoot albums
1971 albums
Albums produced by Joe Wissert
Reprise Records albums